Aelius Donatus (fl. mid-fourth century AD) was a Roman grammarian and teacher of rhetoric.

Works
He was the author of a number of professional works, of which several are extant:

Ars maior – A commentary on Latin grammar.
 Ars minor – A commentary on parts of Latin Speech.
 Commentvm Terenti, Publii Terentii Comoediae Sex with preface de tragoedia et comoedia (Commentary on Terence, Six Comedies of Terence with the preface About Tragedies and Comedies) – A commentary on the playwright Terence and all six of his plays, probably compiled from other commentaries. The preface is a commentary on the "proper" structures of Tragedies and Comedies by Donatus titled, "About Comedies and Tragedies." It has never been translated to English as parts are missing from the original manuscript. It has partially been translated to German.
 Explicatio in Ciceronis De inventione (An Explanation of the Cicero's De Inventione)
 Vita Vergili (Life of Virgil) is thought to be based on a lost Vita by Suetonius, together with the preface and introduction of his commentary on Virgil's works. A greatly expanded version of Servius' commentary exists, however, which is supplemented with frequent and extensive extracts from what is thought to be Donatus' commentary on Virgil.
 
Donatus was a proponent of an early system of punctuation, consisting of dots placed in three successively higher positions to indicate successively longer pauses, roughly equivalent to the modern comma, colon, and full stop. This system remained current through the seventh century, when a more refined system created by Isidore of Seville gained prominence.

In "About Comedy and Tragedy" in his Commentary on Terence, Donatus was the first person known to document the system whereby a play is made up of three separate parts: protasis, epitasis, and catastrophe.

Aelius Donatus should not be confused with Tiberius Claudius Donatus, also the author of a commentary (Interpretationes) on the Aeneid, who lived about 50 years later.

References

Further reading
 Daintree, David. 1990. "The Virgil Commentary of Aelius Donatus: Black Hole or 'Éminence Grise'?" Greece & Rome 37.1: 65–79. 
 Demetriou, Chrysanthi. 2014. "Aelius Donatus and His Commentary on Terence’s Comedies." In The Oxford Handbook of Greek and Roman Comedy. Edited by Michael Fontaine and Adele C. Scafuro, 782–799. Oxford: Oxford Univ. Press.
 Dutsch, Dorota M. 2008. Feminine Discourse in Roman Comedy. Oxford: Oxford Univ. Press.
 Farrell, Joseph. 2016. "Ancient Commentaries on Theocritus’ Idylls and Virgil's Eclogues." In Classical Commentaries: Explorations in a Scholarly Genre. Edited by Christina F. Kraus and Christopher Stray, 397–418. Oxford: Oxford Univ. Press.
 Ferri, Rolando. 2016. "An Ancient Grammarian's View of How the Spoken Language Works: Pragmalinguistic Observations in Donatus' Commentum Terentii." In The Latin of the Grammarians: Reflections about Language in the Roman World. Edited by Rolando Ferri and Anna Zago. Turnhout:  Brepols Publishers.
 Kragelund, Patrick. 2012. "Evidence for Performances of Republican Comedy in Fourth-century Rome." Classical Quarterly 62.1: 415–422.
 Maltby, Robert. 2003. "The Role of Etymologies in Servius and Donatus." In Etymologia: Studies in Ancient Etymology. Proceedings of the Cambridge Conference on Ancient Etymology, 25–27 September 2000. Edited by Christos Nifadopoulos, 103–118. Münster, Germany: Nodus Publikationen.
 McGill, Scott. 2014. "The Plagiarized Virgil in Donatus, Servius, and the Anthologia Latina." Harvard Studies in Classical Philology 107: 365–383.
 Murgia, Charles E. 2004. "The Truth about Vergil's Commentators." In Romane Memento: Vergil in the Fourth Century. Edited by Roger Rees, 189–200. London: Duckworth.
 Stok, F. 2012. "Commenting on Virgil, from Aelius Donatus to Servius." Dead Sea Discoveries 19.3: 464–484.

External links

 W.J. Chase, The Ars minor of Donatus : for one thousand years the leading textbook of grammar, 1926. Latin and English translation. 
 Vita Vergiliana, Aelius Donatus' Life of Virgil in the original Latin.
 Suetonius: The Life of Virgil, the Loeb English translation (which presumes that Donatus' Life "is almost wholly Suetonius’.")
 Virgil.org: Aelius Donatus' Life of Virgil translated into English by David Wilson-Okamura includes interpolated text not included in the Loeb translation
 Latin texts of some of Aelius Donatus, including the Ars Minor and all the parts of the Ars Major
 The commentary on Terence online
Corpus Grammaticorum Latinorum: complete texts and full bibliography
Commentum in Terentii Comoedias From the Rare Book and Special Collections Division at the Library of Congress

Grammarians of Latin
Ancient linguists
4th-century Romans
4th-century Latin writers
Donatus